Rankin is a village in Butler Township, Vermilion County, Illinois, United States. It is part of the Danville, Illinois Metropolitan Statistical Area. The population was 561 at the 2010 census.

History
This town was named after W. A. Rankin, a wealthy landowner in the area.  In 1872, there was a dispute between him and W. H. Pells (who was on the board of directors of the  Lake Erie and Western Railroad) over the location of a railroad station.  Ultimately, over the course of several years, Rankin won out over Pellsville, which was located a mile and a half to the west.  There were railroad maintenance shops in Rankin until 1932 when they were moved to Frankfort, Indiana, and some of the residents of Rankin followed.

In 1972 the town celebrated its centennial, and a small commemorative volume was issued with brief articles on many of the town's families.

The Veterans Memorial
Located on the Main street in Rankin, it was built in 1996.
Local people joined together and put in motion to build this memorial.
Due credit goes to RTHS graduate Margaret "Maggie" Olson Diskin, who spearheaded this project.

Names of more than 700 men and women from the Rankin area who served the United States of America in war and peace are embedded on this monument, including the Civil War, Spanish–American War, WW I, WW II, Korean War, Lebanon Conflict, Vietnam War, Korean War, Operation Enduring Freedom, and Operation Iraqi Freedom.

Its website is "http://www.rankinveteransmemorial.com"

Geography
Rankin is located at  (40.463836, -87.896055).

Demographics

As of the census of 2000, there were 617 people, 247 households, and 162 families residing in the village. The racial makeup of the village was 93.52% White, 0.16% African American, 0.49% Native American, 0.49% Asian, 4.86% from other races, and 0.49% from two or more races. Hispanic or Latino of any race were 6.16% of the population.

There were 247 households, out of which 27.9% had children under the age of 18 living with them, 51.8% were married couples living together, 8.9% had a female householder with no husband present, and 34.4% were non-families. 30.0% of all households were made up of individuals, and 15.8% had someone living alone who was 65 years of age or older. The average household size was 2.50 and the average family size was 3.09.

In the village, the population was spread out, with 27.9% under the age of 18, 6.0% from 18 to 24, 27.1% from 25 to 44, 21.1% from 45 to 64, and 18.0% who were 65 years of age or older. The median age was 37 years. For every 100 females, there were 102.3 males. For every 100 females age 18 and over, there were 96.0 males.

The median income for a household in the village was $29,063, and the median income for a family was $35,234. Males had a median income of $30,446 versus $22,188 for females. The per capita income for the village was $14,005. About 9.2% of families and 13.6% of the population were below the poverty line, including 11.5% of those under age 18 and 11.2% of those age 65 or over.

There are relatively few famous people who have come from Rankin.  However, Dr. Daniel Howard, who graduated from Rankin Township High School in 1978, is a prominent physician in Baltimore, Maryland, where he serves as Chief of Staff at the University of Maryland Medical Center Midtown Campus.

References

Villages in Vermilion County, Illinois
Villages in Illinois
Populated places established in 1872
1872 establishments in Illinois